Hasan Emre Yeşilyurt (born 18 August 2000) is a Turkish professional footballer who plays as a midfielder for Kırklarelispor on loan from Kasımpaşa.

Career
A youth product of Kasımpaşa, Yeşilyurt signed his first professional contract with the team on 5 October 2020. He made his professional debut with Kasımpaşa in a 3–0 Süper Lig loss to Fenerbahçe on 4 January 2021.

References

External links
 
 
 Kasımpaşa Profile

2000 births
People from Şişli
Footballers from Istanbul
Living people
Turkish footballers
Association football midfielders
Kasımpaşa S.K. footballers
Kırklarelispor footballers
Süper Lig players
TFF Second League players
TFF Third League players